Mangamma is a 1997 Malayalam film written and directed by T. V. Chandran, and produced by National Film Development Corporation of India (NFDC). It stars Revathi, Nedumudi Venu, Vijayaraghavan and Thilakan in major roles.

The film met with critical acclaim. T. V. Chandran won the Kerala State Film Award for Best Director. The film won the National Film Award for Best Feature Film in Malayalam. Revathi's performance is widely regarded as one of the best in her career.

Plot
The film is set in two periods — the first in the political milieu of the 1960s when Kerala was brought under the Presidential rule after the dismissal of the first Communist ministry; the second in 1976 during the Emergency, the time of police excesses and political witch-hunting. Due to constant harassment by the local MLA-cum-landlord, Mangamma (Revathi) and her father (Thilakan) are forced to flee their village on the Tamil Nadu-Kerala border. The landlord's son attempts to rape Mangamma's younger sister but unfortunately they both die in a fire that destroys the hut. Mangamma and her father are offered shelter and a job by Nair (Nedumudi Venu), who runs a tea shop with his adopted son Velayudhan. Nair marries Mangamma after her father's death.

The later part of the film takes place 16 years later. Mangamma and Nair have a 15-year-old son - Sankaran, who just flirts around with Lucy, a girl who helps Mangamma in her popcorn business. When Velayudhan who has worked with her since childhood disappears one day, the shop is thrown into disarray. Velayudhan (M. G. Sasi) is now a rebel, wanted by the police. A rich contractor wants to buy Nair's land, and his refusal brings about a catastrophe. The police  harasses Mangamma and Nair. Nair becomes one of the many faceless, nameless victims of the Emergency — he dies in police custody. The tea shop is burnt. Standing up to these trials, Mangamma survives. In the last shot, Velayudhan sits in the tea shop. He is reading a book. He remains in the frame even as Mangamma leaves.

Cast
 Revathi as Mangamma
 Nedumudi Venu as Nair
 Vijayaraghavan as Balan, Mangamma's ex-lover 
 Thilakan as Karuppan Mooppar, Mangamma's father
 M. G. Sasi as Velayudhan, Nair's adopted son
 Oduvil Unnikrishnan as Mannadiyar
Anitha as Sundari, Mangamma's younger sister(Voice By Bhagyalekshmi)
 Gopakumar as Varghese Mapla, Nair's friend
 V. K. Sriraman as contractor
 Jagadeesh
 Ravi Vallathol as Dr. M. S. Menon
 James

Other major characters are
 Sankaran, Nair and Mangamma's son
 Licy, Varghese Mapla's daughter
 Kuttisankara Menon, the wicked landlord and MLA
 Prasad, Kuttisankara Menon's son

References

External links
 
 Mangamma at the Malayalam Movie Database

1990s Malayalam-language films
Films scored by Johnson
Films directed by T. V. Chandran
Best Malayalam Feature Film National Film Award winners
National Film Development Corporation of India films